Tanda is a city and a municipal board in Rampur district in the Indian state of Uttar Pradesh.

Geography
It has an average elevation of 78 metres (255 feet).
Main business of Tanda is rice.

Demographics
 India census, Tanda had a population of 40,009. Males constitute 53% of the population and females 47%. Tanda has an average literacy rate of 36%, lower than the national average of 59.5%: male literacy is 44%, and female literacy is 27%. In Tanda, 21% of the population is under 6 years of age.

References

Cities and towns in Rampur district